A by-election was held for the Australian House of Representatives seat of Bendigo on 6 February 1915. This was triggered by the death of Labor MP and External Affairs Minister John Arthur.

The by-election was won by Labor candidate Alfred Hampson.

Results

References

1915 elections in Australia
Victorian federal by-elections
1910s in Victoria (Australia)